Danny Gray (born 21 May 1983) is a rugby union fly half who plays for the Worcester Warriors, having played for French side US Montauban, Exeter Chiefs and Bristol. He was selected for the England Sevens team in 2006-2007 after having been part of the wider sevens squad in 2005-2006. A prolific scorer Danny Gray was an integral part of Exeter Chiefs plans to gain promotion to the Guinness Premiership. In 2011 Danny signed for Worcester Warriors on a one-year contract.

In 2012, Danny signed for another two-year deal with Worcester Warriors. On 27 February 2014, Gray left Worcester Warriors by mutual consent.

External links 
 Bristol Rugby Profile
 Exeter Chiefs Profile

References

1983 births
Living people
Bristol Bears players
English rugby union players
Rugby union fly-halves
Rugby union players from Sutton, London
Worcester Warriors players